Chris Duffy may refer to:

 Chris Duffy (baseball) (born 1980), American baseball player
 Chris Duffy (footballer, born 1918) (1918–1978), Scottish footballer
 Chris Duffy (footballer, born 1884) (1884–1971), English footballer outside left
 Chris Duffy (footballer, born 1973), English footballer defender
 Christian Duffy (born 1961), American bodybuilder and actor
 Christopher Duffy (born 1936), British military historian
 Christopher Duffy (baseball) (born 1987), American baseball player
 Chris Duffy, member of Waterfront (band)
 Chris Duffy, member of Bazooka Joe (band)
Chris Duffy (wrestler) (1964–2000), American professional wrestler

See also
Chris Duffey (born 1974), creative director of Adobe